Reed Arvin is an American record producer, keyboardist, and writer, known for his work producing music for singer Rich Mullins.

In the early 1980s, Arvin toured as Amy Grant's keyboard player, before teaming up with Mullins in 1986. Arvin produced nine albums for Mullins, including two "best of" collections, Songs and Songs 2.

Arvin's first novel, entitled The Wind in the Wheat, was published in 1994. His second novel, a legal thriller called The Will, was published in 2000. Kiss's Gene Simmons optioned the film rights to The Will shortly after its publication. Since then, Arvin has published two other critically acclaimed thrillers, The Last Goodbye and Blood of Angels.

Bibliography

 The Wind in the Wheat, 1994
 The Will, 2000
 The Last Goodbye
 Blood of Angels

References

Further reading

Kirkus review of one of his works
A review of Blood of Angels
Denver Post review

External links
 

Year of birth missing (living people)
Living people
American record producers
American male novelists
American thriller writers
20th-century American novelists
20th-century American male writers
21st-century American novelists
21st-century American male writers